Jane Howlett is an Australian politician, who has been a Liberal member of the Tasmanian Legislative Council for the division of Prosser since 2018.

After Peter Gutwein became Premier in January 2020, Howlett was promoted to his cabinet as Minister for Sport and Recreation and Minister for Racing. After the 2021 Tasmanian state election in May 2021, she was additionally appointed Minister for Small Business and Minister for Women in the Second Gutwein Ministry. A reshuffle of the cabinet on 17 February 2022 resulted in Howlett also becoming Minister for Disability Services, Minister for Hospitality and Events, but losing the sports portfolio to Nic Street. However, a week later on 25 February, Howlett resigned from the cabinet, citing "personal reasons after the death of her brother", who died the day the Second Gutwein Ministry was sworn in. She has stated she would remain a member of parliament. Her portfolios were taken over by Madeleine Ogilvie later that week.

References

Living people
Members of the Tasmanian Legislative Council
Liberal Party of Australia members of the Parliament of Tasmania
21st-century Australian politicians
21st-century Australian women politicians
Women members of the Tasmanian Legislative Council
Year of birth missing (living people)